Thomas Patrick Byrnes (February 19, 1923 – January 9, 1981) was an American professional basketball player. He played collegiately for Seton Hall University.
He began his professional career playing for the New York Knicks of the Basketball Association of America for three seasons, before being traded to the Indianapolis Jets with cash considerations for Ray Lumpp on January 26, 1949. He spent his final two seasons playing for the Baltimore Bullets, Washington Capitols and Tri-Cities Blackhawks in the NBA.

BAA/NBA career statistics

Regular season

Playoffs

References

External links

1923 births
1981 deaths
American men's basketball players
Baltimore Bullets (1944–1954) players
Basketball players from New Jersey
Forwards (basketball)
Guards (basketball)
Indianapolis Jets players
New York Knicks announcers
New York Knicks players
People from Teaneck, New Jersey
Seton Hall Pirates men's basketball players
Sportspeople from Bergen County, New Jersey
Tri-Cities Blackhawks players
Washington Capitols players